France contains 332 arrondissements (including 12 overseas). 


Complete list

Lists by departments

Overseas departments of France

Mayotte has no arrondissements.

References